Kevin De Jonghe (born 4 December 1991 in Rumst) is a Belgian cyclist, who last rode for Belgian amateur team Baguet–MIBA–Indulek–Derito.

Major results
2009
 1st  Time trial, National Junior Road Championships
2011
 1st  Time trial, National Under-23 Road Championships
2016
 8th Internationale Wielertrofee Jong Maar Moedig
2017
 1st Stage 3 Tour de Savoie Mont Blanc
 3rd Overall Tour de Taiwan
 9th Dwars door de Vlaamse Ardennen

References

External links 
 

1991 births
Living people
Belgian male cyclists
People from Rumst
Cyclists from Antwerp Province